William R. Bates (born April 1, 1991) is an American soccer player who plays for the Richmond Strikers of the National Premier Soccer League.

Career

High school
Bates attended and played soccer at Thomas Dale High School under head coach Mark Fowler.  During his career at TD, he was a four time starter, four time all-district player, two time all-region player, all-state player, and two-time state champion.  He finished his career with 47 goals and 46 assists.

College and Amateur
Bates spent his youth career with Richmond Strikers before committing to the University of Virginia.  In his freshman year, he made 25 appearances for the Cavaliers and led the team with 12 goals and one assist on his way to being named NSCAA All-South Atlantic Region second team, ACC All-Freshman team and was named National Freshman of the Year by Soccer America.  In 2010, he made 17 appearances and tallied eight goals and four assists.  In 2011, he made 15 appearances and tallied 14 goals and four assists before suffering a season ending ACL injury.  In his senior year in 2012, Bates made 20 appearances and scored 12 goals and also recorded an assist.  He finished his career seventh in school history with 46 goals, tied for third in game-winning goals with 15 and ninth in points with 102.

During his college career, Bates also played for Reading United A.C. in the USL Premier Development League.

Professional
On January 22, 2013, Bates was drafted fifth overall in the 2013 MLS Supplemental Draft by Seattle Sounders FC.  Despite not earning a spot on the roster at the start of the season, Bates continued to train with the Sounders and would eventually sign with the club on April 19.

On May 10, Bates was loaned to USL Pro club Phoenix FC for one match and would make his professional debut in that match against Dayton Dutch Lions which ended in a 4-3 defeat.

References

External links

University of Virginia bio
U.S. U-20 bio

1991 births
Living people
American soccer players
Virginia Cavaliers men's soccer players
Reading United A.C. players
Richmond Strikers players
National Premier Soccer League players
Seattle Sounders FC players
Phoenix FC players
Soccer players from Richmond, Virginia
Seattle Sounders FC draft picks
USL League Two players
USL Championship players
United States men's youth international soccer players
People from Chester, Virginia
Association football forwards